Lehtimaja is a 1946 poetry collection by Finnish poet and translator Aale Tynni.

Extract

1946 poems
Finnish literature